Theophilus (Gottlieb) Siegfried Bayer (1694–1738), was a German classical scholar with specialization in Sinology. He was a Sinologist and professor of Greek and Roman Antiquities at St Petersburg Academy of Sciences between 1726 and 1737.

Personal details

Bayer was a native of Königsberg, East Prussia. His father Johann Friedrich was from the German Protestant minority in Hungary, but had moved to East Prussia where he worked as a painter. The youthful T. S. Bayer was an excellent student at the University of Königsberg, studying Latin, Greek and Hebrew. He was a Rector of the Königsberg Cathedral from 1721 to 1726, and also worked as a librarian at the Königsberg Public Library.

Bayer collection
He had a library of more than 200 manuscripts, Chinese and other Oriental books, including:
 Telugu and Tamil Palm-leaf manuscripts
 Oriental history and philology-related notes
 Correspondence with Jesuits in Peking.

After his death in Saint Petersburg his widow handed over his books and papers to the Academy authorities, receiving the rest of her husband's pay due that year. The library was later sold to a Lutheran pastor in London, Heinrich Walter Gerdes.  William Hunter later purchased the collection from Gerdes' widow.  It finally reached the University of Glasgow in 1807 with a brief stay in London with Dr Matthew Baillie, Hunter's nephew.

His works

 Historia regni Graecorum bactriani [A History of the Kingdom of the Bactrian Greeks].
 Manuscript in Latin and Chinese.
 De Eclipsi Sinica published in 1718.
 Museum sinicum, a two-volume compendium of materials on the Chinese language published in 1730.
 Works on the history of Russia, including De Varagis (1729) and Origines russicae (1736).

References

External links
 Transferring linguistic knowledge from Asia to Europe. T. S. Bayer’s reception of Indian missionary grammars.
 T.S. Bayer, 1694-1738 : pioneer sinologist - Author: Knud Lundbæk
 Manuscripts - Collections relating to Theophilus Gottlieb Siegfried Bayer
 Visitors from Guangxhou, China - The tour was rounded off with a visit to Special Collections to view a display of Chinese material which included part of the collection of Theophilus Gottlieb Siegfried Bayer (1694-1738), sinologist.

1694 births
1738 deaths
18th-century German writers
18th-century German male writers
German librarians
German numismatists
German orientalists
German philologists
German sinologists
Writers from Königsberg
People from East Prussia
Russian orientalists
Russian philologists
Full members of the Saint Petersburg Academy of Sciences
Religious studies scholars
German male non-fiction writers